Gino Lupini is a retired South African-Italian professional rugby union player who played in the top domestic Italian league Top10 and for Italy Sevens in 10 competitions, making 43 match appearances.

Early life

He was born in Cape Town, where he grew up and went to Sweet Valley Primary School where he was elected as first team rugby captain. Lupini then joined his two older brothers at SACS high school in Newlands, the oldest school in South Africa, close to Newlands Stadium.

Rugby 
After having two very successful years in the first 15 at South African College Schools (2011-2012), he was selected to join the Italian under 20 squad ahead of the 2013 IRB Junior World Rugby Trophy (Did not take part due to injury).

Western Province 
In 2014, he joined the Western Province Rugby Academy, he was fortunate enough to later be added to the u21 Western Province (rugby team) who went on to win the  u21 Currie Cup. Gino stayed with the u21 squad at Western Province (rugby team) in 2015 who once again went on to win the u21 Currie Cup.

Mogliano Rugby 
In 2015, he left Western Province (rugby team) to join Mogliano Rugby in Italy, ahead of the Italian pre-season training. Here he would go on to play his debut season in the National Championship of Excellence and the European Challenge Cup qualifier.

San Dona Rugby 
In 2016, he started at the international level, playing for Italian Rugby Federation in the form of rugby sevens where he burst onto the Rugby Europe scene in the 2016 FIRA Grand prix sevens series. He also joined up with his new 15 man club ;Rugby San Dona to play in the National Championship of Excellence. .In 2017 , Gino Lupini has continued to be form with Italian Rugby Federation , Italy Seven gaining two player of the tournament trophies in the two international tournaments in which he played. He has continued playing the 15 man format of the game with his chosen club Rugby San Dona.

I Medicei Rugby 
In 2018, Gino Lupini once again continued to play with the Italian Rugby Federation , Italy Seven where he and the team went on to win a bronze medal in Moscow, the first leg of the FIRA Grand prix sevens series. Gino Lupini also decided to change clubs in the 15 man format of the game. He now plays for I Medicei in the newly named Top12 Italian domestic championship.

Verona Rugby 
In 2019, Lupini moved to Verona Rugby where he played in Series A. He and Verona rugby had a dominant start to the season, where they did not loose a single match and were favourites to take the title, but the season was interrupted after 12 games played due to the COVID-19 pandemic. 

Lupini also managed to complete his Bachelors of Education from UNISA during this season.

Retirement 
During the COVID-19 pandemic crisis 2020, Lupini announced his retirement with immediate effect. He had suffered a number of concussions throughout his playing career, he announced his retirement on his social media accounts and with an Italian rugby journalist from ONRUGBY.IT.

He stated that it is, 'Strange to think I am writing this at 26, but after a few months of contemplating and not due to lack of opportunity I am lucky enough to blow final whistle on my playing career, both literally and figuratively hanging up my boots. I feel that it is best for me to focus on my future.I feel so grateful and thankful that I have had the chance to turn my childhood dream into a reality and I can only hope that it be considered a success. I was fortunate enough to be with so many amazing teams, have such successful teammates and most importantly, made friendships that will last a lifetime. I couldn't have chased my childhood dream without the support from family and friends, thank you all for being there for me, no one could have asked for more."'' 

Lupini is now a teacher at private International school in Milan, Italy. Additionally he has focused himself on his charity work. 

 Honours 

 Rugby Eccellenza (became Top10 (rugby union), 4th in Classification 2015-2016
 Coppa Italia, Winner 2017
 Rugby Europe Sevens, Bronze medalist, Russia, 2017
 Elected Best Center in Eccellenza, 2018 

 National honours 
  
 Knight of Merit of the Sacred Military Constantinian Order of Saint George 
 Knight of Merit''' of the  Civil Order of Savoy

References

Italian rugby union players
South African rugby union players
1994 births
Living people
Alumni of South African College Schools
Rugby union centres
Rugby union players from Cape Town